Anaxagorea crassipetala is a species of understory tree in the Annonaceae family. It is found frequently in the lowland rainforests of Costa Rica and Panama, but extends down to Peru.

References 

crassipetala
Flora of Costa Rica
Flora of Panama